Seyed Ayatollah Karamatollah Malek-Hosseini (1924 – 2 November 2012) was an Iranian Ayatollah and member of the Second, Third and Fourth terms of the Assembly of Experts.

Biography 
Karamatollah Malek Hosseini was born in a village called Gusheh-ye Shahzadeh Qasem in Kohgiluyeh and Boyer-Ahmad Province to a religious family in 1924. His father Seyed Sadr-Aldin Malek-Hosseini was a prominent cleric in Boyer-Ahmad. He studied Islam in both Shiraz and Qom. During the Iranian Revolution he was a critic of the Pahlavi regime and was arrested by SAVAK. After the revolution he served in the Assembly of Experts, as well as representing the Supreme Leader of Iran in Kohgiluyeh and Boyer-Ahmad Province. After his death, his son Sharaf-Aldin took his spot for the remainder of the fourth term and then was elected again for the Fifth term.

Religious education 
From an early age he was learning Islam and Arabic from his father. When he was 15, he migrated to Shiraz to continue his education in high school. Afterwards, in 1941 he officially began his Islamic Studies. There, he learnt under Abdul-Karim Haeri Yazdi and Mirza Ahamd Darabi. After, he finally migrated to Qom to further his Islamic studies in Qom Seminary. There, he was taught by the likes of Hossein Borujerdi, Ruhollah Khomeini, Muhammad Husayn Tabatabai, Seyyed Mohammad Hojjat Kooh Kamari, Seyed Mohammad Taqi Khonsari, and Mohammad Mohaqeq Damad. There he mastered his knowledge in Islamic jurisprudence, interpretation of Quran, and Usool Fiqh. It was in Qom where he reached the level of Ijtihad. After the passing of Hossein Borujerdi in 1961, he migrated back to Shiraz to begin teaching at the Khan Theological School.

Political activism 
While teaching in Shiraz, Karamatollah began to resent Mohammad Reza Pahlavi and the Pahlavi regime. This happened primarily after the attack on Feyziyeh Seminary on March 22, 1963. SAVAK agents and operatives disguised as farmers stormed the seminary, beating many clerics and killing young Seyed Younes Rudbari as he was beaten to death. Another 2-3 students were killed due to injuries sustained from being beaten and thrown off rooftops. Afterwards, Karamatollah would often give Khutbahs in the Habib Mosque in Shiraz showing his resentment to the Pahlavi regime. His infamous arrest by SAVAK was in 1978 where a crowd that gathered at Habib Mosque clashed with SAVAK. Three protestors were killed as a result of gunfire, which then led to the arrest of Seyed Karamatollah. His arrest led to protests by tribesman across the Kohgiluyeh and Boyer-Ahmad province, and Shiraz. As a result of these protests he was released 2 days later.

Students 

 Seyed Ali Asghar Hosseini
 Seyed Sharaf-Aldin Malek-Hosseini
 Seyed Ali Mohammad Bozorgvari
 Mohammad Reza Adinehvand
 Sheikh Ghader Haydari Fasai
 Sheikh Mostafa Zamani
 Sheikh Abotaleb Abadi Genavehi
 Sheikh Yousef Salmanzadeh Borazjani
 Sheikh Khodamrad Raji Abarqawi

Death 
Seyed Karamatollah passed away on the morning of 2 November 2012 in Namazi Hospital, Shiraz. His death prompted Ali Khamenei expressing his condolences. Many had attended his funeral as he was a very popular figure in Kohgiluyeh and Boyer-Ahmad, he was buried in his hometown Gusheh-ye Shahzadeh Qasem.

See also 

 List of Ayatollahs
 Usul Fiqh in Ja'fari school
 List of members in the Second Term of the Council of Experts
 List of members in the Third Term of the Council of Experts
 List of members in the Fourth Term of the Council of Experts

References 

1924 births
2012 deaths
Members of the Assembly of Experts
People from Kohgiluyeh and Boyer-Ahmad Province
Iranian ayatollahs